Ratskin is a 1929 animated cartoon released by Columbia Pictures starring Krazy Kat. It is the first cartoon to be released by Columbia Pictures and the first Krazy Kat cartoon released with sound.

Plot
Krazy Kat hunts for one turkey. He shoots with his gun what he thinks is turkey, but turns out to be a Native American instead. The Indian chases Krazy and gets caught. An anamorphic pole ties Krazy up, and the Indians light a fire below him. Krazy manages to escape from the Indians, but then the Indians start shooting arrows at him. Krazy finds his gun and uses it as a record player, and the Indians start dancing. A female Indian wants to kiss Krazy, but he hits her with his gun instead. All of the Indians get angry and try to get Krazy, but Krazy escapes from the crowd, dismantles his gun, and uses the Indians (now huddled in a circle, not realizing Krazy had escaped) as a record player.

Music
The music in the title sequence is called Me-Ow, a 1918 composition by Mel B. Kaufman. It would be used in some subsequent short films of the series until Slow Beau.

Availability 
Ratskin has yet to be released on any home video format. It does however, circulate through a bootleg recording of an ASIFA screening, the only time the cartoon was publicly shown since its original release

See also
 Krazy Kat filmography

References

External links
Ratskin at the Big Cartoon Database
 

American black-and-white films
1929 films
Krazy Kat shorts
Columbia Pictures short films
Hunting in popular culture
1920s American animated films
1929 animated films
Columbia Pictures animated short films
American animated short films
Films about Native Americans
Screen Gems short films